William Beer may refer to:

 William Andrew Beer (1862–1954), British painter who worked as Andrew Beer
 Will Beer (born 1988), English cricketer